is a professional Japanese baseball player. He plays pitcher for the Orix Buffaloes.

References 

1997 births
Living people
Baseball people from Hyōgo Prefecture
Japanese baseball players
Nippon Professional Baseball pitchers
Orix Buffaloes players